Marcus Hill (born March 30, 1992), better known as Dyrus, is an American Twitch streamer and former professional player of the multiplayer online battle arena (MOBA) game League of Legends. Dyrus was the top laner for Team SoloMid (TSM) for most of his professional League of Legends career. With TSM, he won several LCS titles and appeared at several World Championships. He retired from professional play after the 2015 World Championship, although he briefly returned to play in 2017.

Career
Dyrus has been playing League of Legends since its beta phase. Dyrus' favorite champion is Singed, through which he acquired rank 1 with in the beta phase. Dyrus' career started out as a support for one of the first competitive teams in the League of Legends professional scene, All or Nothing. Following the disbandment of All or Nothing, Dyrus joined Epik Gamer as their top laner. Dyrus gained exposure following his decision to start streaming on Twitch because of his unique play, interesting personality, and success of Epik Gamer at LAN tournaments. Dyrus later moved in into the gaming house of New York-based Team SoloMid (TSM) to pursue a full-time gaming career while still playing for Epik Gamer.

Following the resignation of TheRainMan from TSM, Dyrus offered himself as RainMan's replacement. Prior to his signing, Dyrus had already been living in the TSM gaming house. With Dyrus' former team's blessing, Dyrus resigned from Epik Gamer and has been playing as the top laner for Team SoloMid.

Dyrus and teammate Xpecial were selected for North American team at the May 2013 all-star League of Legends tournament in Shanghai.

Dyrus and TSM won the 2014 Spring split and the 2014 Summer split. In the 2015 Spring NA LCS, Dyrus helped TSM win the regular season and the playoffs. Team SoloMid was the winner of the Intel Extreme Masters Season IX Katowice World Finals. They defeated Team WE 3 to 0 in the finals.

Winning the 2015 Spring LCS granted them one of six invitations to the 2015 Mid-Season Invitational in the inaugural year for the event. TSM finished in 5th place at the event. In the summer split, TSM finished in 2nd place being defeated by Counter Logic Gaming in the playoffs.

At the 2015 League of Legends World Championship, TSM was placed in Group D which consisted of Origen, LGD Gaming, and KT Rolster known as the "Group of Death". TSM finished fourth place in its group and was unable to progress further. After TSM faced their last game at the tournament against LGD, Dyrus retired and was given a standing ovation for his contribution to TSM.

Hill returned to professional play in June 2017, joining Echo Fox Challenger team Delta Fox to compete in the North America Challenger Series (NA CS). The team disbanded competitively after the NA CS league ended later in the year.

Personal life
Marcus Hill was born on March 30, 1992, and grew up in Honolulu, Hawaii. Dyrus went into professional League of Legends despite the wishes of his father, Mark Hill, who wanted him to work for the family plumbing business. On June 29, 2016, Dyrus announced his relationship with Emiru, a Twitch streamer. In November 2020 they officially broke up.

Notable tournament placements

2011

2012

2013

2014

2015

References

External links
 Video archive
 Team SoloMid website
Dyrus Twitch channel

1992 births
Living people
People from Honolulu
American esports players
Team SoloMid players
League of Legends top lane players
Epik Gamer players
Twitch (service) streamers